Heilsberg may refer to:

 German name of Lidzbark Warmiński
 Battle of Heilsberg
 Transmitter Heilsberg

See also 
 Lidzbark
 Lidzbark (disambiguation)